Willshire Township is one of the twelve townships of Van Wert County, Ohio, United States.  The 2000 census found 1,719 people in the township, 1,057 of whom lived in the unincorporated portions of the township.

Geography
Located in the southwestern corner of the county along the Indiana line, it borders the following townships:
Harrison Township - north
Pleasant Township - northeast corner
Liberty Township - east
Dublin Township, Mercer County - southeast corner
Black Creek Township, Mercer County - south
Blue Creek Township, Adams County, Indiana - southwest
St. Marys Township, Adams County, Indiana - west

Two villages are located in Willshire Township: Willshire in the southwest, and Wren in the northwest.  The unincorporated communities of Abanaka and Glenmore lie in the township's east.

Name and history
It is the only Willshire Township statewide.

Government
The township is governed by a three-member board of trustees, who are elected in November of odd-numbered years to a four-year term beginning on the following January 1. Two are elected in the year after the presidential election and one is elected in the year before it. There is also an elected township fiscal officer, who serves a four-year term beginning on April 1 of the year after the election, which is held in November of the year before the presidential election. Vacancies in the fiscal officership or on the board of trustees are filled by the remaining trustees.

References

External links
County website

Townships in Van Wert County, Ohio
Townships in Ohio